Mary Downey Powers (September 10, 1922 – June 25, 2016) was a Chicago area civil rights activist, particularly with the gay and lesbian community and fighting for police accountability. Powers is a 1992 inductee into the Chicago LGBT Hall of Fame.

Biography
Powers died at the age of 93 on June 25, 2016, at Evanston Hospital. Sue grew up in East Lansing and Flint, Michigan, and graduated from the University of Wisconsin–Madison With a sociology degree.  After marrying William Powers, with whom she had three children they settled in Winnetka, Illinois, later living in Wilmette, Illinois.

Career
She was a founder of a watchdog group called Citizens Alert to combat police corruption. The group was vital in having cameras installed in police interrogation rooms and for reparations for the victims of Commander Jon Burge.

She worked to bring Martin Luther King Jr. to Winnetka’s Village Green for a speech in 1965.

She became Vice President of the Alliance to End Repression In 1969.

Powers worked for Western Electric from 1946 until 1950. Her work with the LGBT community began there having met employees fearing they could lose their jobs if their sexuality was made known.

References

External links
Police watchdog Mary Powers dies

1922 births
2016 deaths
Inductees of the Chicago LGBT Hall of Fame
University of Wisconsin–Madison College of Letters and Science alumni
Civil rights activists